is a female professional wrestling fighting game developed by Konami for the Xbox 360 as the sequel to the 2004 PlayStation 2 game Rumble Roses. The game was released by Konami in 2006. Rumble Roses XX is playable on Xbox One via backwards compatibility.

Gameplay

With the exception of a simple street fighting mode, the bulk of the gameplay focuses on matches which take place in various locales. Matches can be between individual wrestlers, between tag teams of two wrestlers each, or between a wrestler and a team (a more difficult handicap match).

Matches are won either through pinning an opponent or forcing the opponent to tap out with a submission move. Players can break free of these through rapid button presses, although as wrestlers suffer more damage (both overall and to specific body parts), this becomes more difficult.

The general game mechanics involve striking and grappling with foes to inflict damage upon different body parts. As successful strikes and grapples are performed, players fill a finishing move gauge which can be expended to activate special moves. Attacks can also be countered with the correct timing, resulting in humiliation for the opposing character. When humiliation builds up to a certain level, wrestlers become vulnerable to special "H-Moves", which have a high probability of inflicting a knockout. Other special moves activated via the filled gauges include "Killer Moves" and "Lethal Moves", which differ for each wrestler.

Rumble Roses XX supports online Xbox Live gameplay for up to four players, playing as a team or against each other. The online content also allowed the player to upload or download images from the game's photo shoot mode.

A wide array of character customization options are available from within the Customization Mode. These include various unlockable costumes and swimsuits, as well as adjustable sliders which can be used to increase or decrease body and muscle attributes.

The game also includes a Tag Team mode where two players can partake in a tag match. Whenever two specific wrestlers are teamed up, they will have their own special team intro, team name, tag-out sequence, Special Double X move and a special victory pose. There are only three characters in the game that don't have a team partner and those three girls are Yasha, Becky and Evil Rose.

The special teams and their names are:
 Reiko Hinomoto & Noble Rose: The Kamikaze Typhoon
 Candy Cane & Miss Spencer: The Punk & Teacher Alliance (P. T. A.)
 Makoto Aihara & Aigle: The Great Beautiful Strong Pair (G. B. S. P.)  
 Reiko Hinomoto & Dixie Clemets: Tequila Sunrise
 Dixie Clemets & Aisha: Rodeo Drive
 Anesthesia & Benikage: The Balance Of Terror
 Sista A & Mistress: The Vanity Twins
 The Black Belt Demon & Great Khan: The Naughty Empire
 Sgt. Clemets & Rowdy Reiko: Original Sin
 Dr. Anesthesia & Lady X Subsistence: Anesthesia's Experiment

Plot
Unlike the previous game in the series, Rumble Roses XX does not have a story mode.

Development

The animations for Rumble Roses XX were created with a mixture of traditional animation and motion-capture. In an interview for Kotaku at the 2005 Tokyo Game Show, producer Akari Uchida said: "For this game, we've done a lot of motion capture and rendered individual motions for every character. No two characters will be moving the same way".

Uchida also said that "we wanted to do a game for the first Xbox", but the decision was made to develop for the 360 upon learning of its superior technical abilities.

To promote the game, three of its theme songs were made available for karaoke at Joy Sound starting on April 10, 2006.

Reception

Rumble Roses XX received "mixed" reviews according to video game review aggregator Metacritic. In Japan, Famitsu gave it a score of one nine, two eights, and one seven for a total of 32 out of 40.

Although the game was generally unpopular in North America, it was relatively well received in Japan and rereleased in a Platinum Collection edition. It was the fifth best selling Xbox 360 title in Japan from the console's launch in December 2005 to June 20, 2006. By December 9, 2007, the game had dropped to 18th place in Japanese sales.

The character Reiko Hinomoto came in fourth place in a poll that asked 1500 Japanese gamers to name their favorite Xbox 360 heroine.

See also

List of licensed wrestling video games

References

External links

 

2006 video games
3D fighting games
Konami games
Professional wrestling games
Video games scored by Akira Yamaoka
Video games featuring female protagonists
Xbox 360 games
Xbox 360-only games
Video games developed in Japan